Krenkel Bay (Bukhta Krenkelya), is a bay in Severnaya Zemlya, Krasnoyarsk Krai, Russia.

History
This bay was discovered by the 1930–1932 expedition to the archipelago led by Georgy Ushakov and Nikolay Urvantsev. Decades later, in 1973, this bay was named after Soviet Arctic explorer and radio operator Ernst Krenkel (1903–1971).

Geography
Krenkel Bay is a body of water in the northeastern area of Komsomolets Island, the northernmost island of Severnaya Zemlya.

The bay is open to the southeast. The edge of the massive Academy of Sciences Glacier runs all along the western shore, while the northern shoreline is bound by a stretch of unglaciated area. Ozerny Island lies close to the northeastern headland of the bay.

See also
List of fjords of Russia

References

External links

Eurasian Arctic Tectonics - DiVA

Bays of Severnaya Zemlya
Bays of the Laptev Sea